Events from the year 1956 in the United Kingdom. The year is dominated by the Suez Crisis.

Incumbents
 Monarch – Elizabeth II
 Prime Minister – Anthony Eden (Conservative)
 Parliament – 41st

Events
 1 January – Possession of heroin becomes fully criminalised.
 4 January – Eight months after winning the general election and barely a year after becoming Prime Minister, Anthony Eden's position is looking under threat as opinion polls show Labour (now led by Hugh Gaitskell) are in the lead.
 24 January – Plans are announced for the construction of thousands of new homes in the Barbican area of London, devastated by the Luftwaffe during the Second World War.
 26 January–5 February – Great Britain and Northern Ireland compete at the Winter Olympics in Cortina d'Ampezzo, Italy, but do not win any medals.
 February
 The Duke of Edinburgh's Award launched.
 Release of Shirley Bassey's first single, "Burn My Candle (At Both Ends)".
 5 February – First showing of documentary films by the Free Cinema movement, at the National Film Theatre, London.
 8 February 
 The first AEC Routemaster bus in London starts public service, on route 2.
 The Treaty of London (1956) is signed to set up an independent Federation of Malaya
 11 February – Two of the "Cambridge spies", Guy Burgess and Donald Maclean, appear in Moscow after vanishing as diplomats in mysterious circumstances in 1951.
 12 February – Double yellow lines to prohibit parking introduced in Slough.
 23 February – A fire at Eastwood Mills, Keighley, West Yorkshire, kills eight employees.
 9 March – Archbishop Makarios is deported from Cyprus to the Seychelles by the British authorities.
 10 March – Fairey Aviation test pilot Peter Twiss sets a new airspeed record in the Fairey Delta 2, also becoming the first person to exceed 1,000 mph (1,610 km/hr) in level flight. His top speed is 1,132 mph (1,821 km/h), 310 mph (499 km/h) in excess of the previous (U.S.) record.
 14 March – A memorial to Karl Marx is unveiled at the new site of his grave in Highgate Cemetery, London, by Harry Pollitt, General Secretary of the Communist Party of Great Britain.
 24 March – In the Grand National, Devon Loch, owned by Queen Elizabeth The Queen Mother and ridden by Dick Francis, is in a clear lead when the horse inexplicably collapses fifty yards (45 m) from the finish, giving victory to E.S.B. at 100/7, ridden by Dave Dick and trained by Fred Rimell. Stan Mellor is the second placed jockey.
 7 April – Manchester United, with an average team age of just 24, win the Football League First Division title.
 17 April
 In his Budget speech, Chancellor of the Exchequer Harold Macmillan announces the launch of Premium Bonds, which will go on sale on 1 November, with a £1,000 prize available from the first draw in June next year.
 Chew Valley Lake in Somerset is inaugurated as a reservoir for the Bristol area by the Queen.
 19 April – Diver Lionel Crabb (working for MI6) dives into Portsmouth Harbour to investigate visiting Soviet cruiser Ordzhonikidze and vanishes during a state visit by Nikita Khrushchev and Nikolai Bulganin. On 9 May Anthony Eden, who had refused permission for the operation, makes a statement refusing to reveal any details surrounding the mystery of Crabb's disappearance.
 20 April – Humphrey Lyttelton and his band record his trad jazz composition "Bad Penny Blues" in London with sound engineer Joe Meek. This will be the first British jazz record to get into the Top Twenty.
 22 April – The 2i's Coffee Bar opens in Old Compton Street, Soho (London); its basement rapidly becomes a pioneering venue for rock and roll music in Britain.
 27 April – Doubts about the future of Anthony Eden as Prime Minister continue as his personal ratings in opinion polls remain low.
 3 May – Granada Television launched with a base in Manchester.
 5 May – Manchester City F.C. win the FA Cup with a 3–1 win over Birmingham City at Wembley Stadium. German-born goalkeeper Bert Trautmann plays through the game despite an injury 15 minutes from time diagnosed on 9 May as a broken neck.
 7 May – Minister of Health Robin Turton rejects a call for the government to lead an anti-smoking campaign, arguing that no ill-effects have yet been proven.
 8 May – First performance of John Osborne's play Look Back in Anger by the newly formed English Stage Company at the Royal Court Theatre. Alan Bates has his first major role as Cliff. The theatre's press release describes the dramatist as among the angry young men of the time.
 9 May – The Gower Peninsula of Wales becomes the first area in the British Isles to be designated an Area of Outstanding Natural Beauty.
 1 June – Elsie Stephenson becomes founding Director of the Nurse Teaching Unit, University of Edinburgh, the first nurse teaching unit within a British university.
 3 June
 Third class accommodation on British Railways trains redesignated as second class (also applies on Great Northern Railway in Northern Ireland).
 Prime ministers Jawaharlal Nehru of India and Sidney Holland of New Zealand are made Freemen of the City of London.
 4 July – The National Library of Scotland's first purpose-built premises are opened on George IV Bridge in Edinburgh.
 5 July – Parliament passes the Clean Air Act in response to the Great Smog of 1952.
 9 July – Mettoy introduce Corgi Toys model cars, manufactured in South Wales.
 10 July – A private member's bill to abolish the death penalty is vetoed in the House of Lords; however, no capital punishment is carried out in the UK this year.
 22 July – The first UK Albums Chart is published, in Record Mirror (Frank Sinatra's Songs for Swingin' Lovers! tops it for the first two weeks.)
 26 July – Egyptian leader Gamal Abdel Nasser announces the nationalisation of the Suez Canal triggering the Suez Crisis.
 27 July – First Berni Inn steakhouse opens in Bristol.
 31 July – Jim Laker sets a record by taking 19 wickets in a first class cricket match, at Old Trafford in the fourth Test between England and Australia.
 9 August–9 September – Art exhibition This Is Tomorrow, featuring principally the interdisciplinary ICA Independent Group, at the Whitechapel Art Gallery, London. Among the exhibits is Richard Hamilton's collage Just What Is It that Makes Today's Homes So Different, So Appealing?, considered to be one of the earliest works of pop art.
 17 August – Scotland Yard are called to Eastbourne to investigate the activities of society doctor John Bodkin Adams. The case is reported around the world and press reports claim up to 400 patients may have been murdered.
 4 September – Opening of the first Welsh-medium secondary school in Wales – Ysgol Glan Clwyd, Rhyl.
 10 September – Guy Mollet visits London and proposes a merger of France and the United Kingdom. However, the idea is rejected by Anthony Eden.
 12 September – Manchester United become the first English team to compete in the European Cup, a competition for the champions of domestic leagues across Europe, when they play the first leg of the preliminary round in Belgium and beat R.S.C. Anderlecht 2–0.
 25 September – The TAT-1 transatlantic telephone cable between the UK and North America inaugurated.
 26 September – Manchester United qualify for the first round of the European Cup in style with a 10–0 win over R.S.C. Anderlecht at Maine Road in the second leg of the preliminary round. 
 28 September – Eden considers allowing France to join the Commonwealth of Nations, but this idea is also rejected.
 15 October – The RAF retires its last Lancaster bomber.
 17 October – The Queen opens the world's first commercial nuclear power station at Calder Hall.
 24 October – Protocol of Sèvres, a secret agreement between the UK, France and Israel allowing the latter to invade Sinai with the support of the two former governments. Eden subsequently denies existence of an agreement.
 5 November
 Jo Grimond replaces Clement Davies as leader of the Liberal Party. 
 Long-running television programme What the Papers Say airs for the first time.
 6 November – British and French forces seize control of two major ports in the Suez Canal in Egypt before declaring a ceasefire.
 9 November – At the Lord Mayor's Show in London, the first AEC Routemaster forms part of the procession, advertised as "London's Bus of the Future".
 15 November – The Manchester Guardian calls for the resignation of Anthony Eden as Prime Minister, despite his improvement in opinion poll showings.
 21 November – DIDO heavy water enriched uranium nuclear reactor opens at the Atomic Energy Research Establishment, Harwell, Oxfordshire.
 22 November–8 December – Great Britain and Northern Ireland compete at the Olympics in Melbourne, Australia, and win 6 gold, 7 silver and 11 bronze medals.
 29 November – Petrol rationing introduced because of petrol blockades from the Middle East due to the Suez Crisis.
 10 December – Cyril Norman Hinshelwood wins the Nobel Prize in Chemistry jointly with Nikolay Semyonov "for their researches into the mechanism of chemical reactions".
 12 December – The Irish Republican Army launches its Border Campaign in Northern Ireland with co-ordinated attacks on official premises.
 19 December
 Six people die and several more are injured in car crashes caused by heavy fog in northern England.
 Eastbourne GP Dr John Bodkin Adams is arrested for the murder of patient Edith Alice Morrell.
 21 December – The Government of Northern Ireland under Basil Brooke uses the Special Powers Act to intern several hundred republican suspects without trial.
 23 December – British and French troops withdraw from Suez under United Nations and United States pressure.
 25 December – PG Tips launches its long-running ITV advertising campaign using a chimpanzees' tea party (with voices provided by Peter Sellers).
 31 December – The Flanders and Swann revue At the Drop of a Hat opens in London.

Undated
 Opening of the first Jewish seminary for Liberal and Reform Judaism in England – Leo Baeck College, as the Jewish Theological College of London at West London Synagogue; its first two students are Lionel Blue and Michael Leigh.
 Tesco opens its first self-service stores in St Albans and Maldon.
 The Collared dove first breeds in the UK.
 Death of the last Agapemonite.

Publications
 Agatha Christie's Hercule Poirot novel Dead Man's Folly.
 Anthony Crosland's book The Future of Socialism.
 Gerald Durrell's memoir My Family and Other Animals.
 Ian Fleming's James Bond novel Diamonds Are Forever.
 William Golding's novel Pincher Martin.
 C. S. Lewis' novel The Last Battle.
 Rose Macaulay's novel The Towers of Trebizond.
 Nancy Mitford's book Noblesse Oblige: an Enquiry into the Identifiable Characteristics of the English Aristocracy, illustrated by Osbert Lancaster.
 Samuel Selvon's novel The Lonely Londoners.
 Dodie Smith's children's novel The Hundred and One Dalmatians.
 Angus Wilson's novel Anglo-Saxon Attitudes.
 Colin Wilson's study The Outsider.
 The Movement's poetry anthology New Lines edited by Robert Conquest.

Births

 2 January – Storm Constantine, science fiction and fantasy author
 4 January – Bernard Sumner, guitarist (Joy Division and New Order)
 6 January 
 Angus Deayton, actor and television presenter
 Justin Welby, Archbishop of Canterbury
 7 January – Johnny Owen, né Owens, Welsh bantamweight boxer (died 1980)
 9 January – Imelda Staunton, English actress
 14 January – Ronan Bennett, Northern Irish writer
 17 January – Paul Young, pop singer and guitarist
 21 January – Ian McMillan, poet
 29 January – Anton Otulakowski, footballer
 31 January – John Lydon (Johnny Rotten), punk rock singer-songwriter (Sex Pistols)
 2 February – Philip Franks, actor and director
 4 February – Jon Walmsley, television actor and guitarist
 8 February – Richard Sharp, banker and Chairman of the BBC
 12 February – Joe Dever, fantasy author (died 2016)
 13 February – Peter Hook, bass guitar player (Joy Division and New Order)
 16 February – Paul Gilroy, academic
 19 February – Dave Wakeling, rock singer-songwriter
 22 February – Stuart Peach, Air Chief Marshal
 24 February – Fiona Graham-Mackay, née Bain, portrait painter
 25 February – Davie Cooper, Scottish footballer (died 1995)
 7 March – Andrea Levy, novelist (died 2019)
 11 March – Helen Rollason, television sports presenter (died 1999)
 12 March
 Steve Harris, bass guitar player, founding member of Iron Maiden
 Lesley Manville, actress
 17 March – Frank McGarvey, footballer (died 2023)
 20 March – Catherine Ashton, Baroness Ashton of Upholland, politician
 23 March
 Rosa Beddington, biologist (died 2001)
 Andrew Mitchell, soldier and politician, Secretary of State for International Development
 Jeremy Wade, biologist and author
 19 April
 Sue Barker, tennis player and television presenter
 Anne Glover, Scottish biologist
 25 April – Greg Richards, decathlete
 26 April – Koo Stark, actress
 13 May – Richard Madeley, television presenter
 14 May – Hazel Blears, politician
 15 May – Kjartan Poskitt, author
 18 May – John Godber, dramatist
 24 May – Joe Casely-Hayford, fashion designer (died 2019)
 26 May 
 Neil Parish, politician
 Fiona Shackleton, lawyer 
 6 June – Christopher Adamson, film actor
 20 June – Simon Bryant, air marshal
 5 July – Terry Chimes, rock drummer (The Clash)
 15 July – Ian Curtis, post-punk singer-songwriter (Joy Division) (died 1980)
 19 July – Nikki Sudden, guitarist and singer-songwriter (Swell Maps) (died 2006)
 26 July  – Andy Goldsworthy, sculptor and photographer
 8 August – Chris Foreman, rock guitarist
 17 August – Dave Jones, footballer and manager
 21 August – Kim Cattrall, screen actress
 7 September – Robert Reed, Baron Reed of Allermuir, Scottish judge, President of the Supreme Court of the UK
 14 September – Ray Wilkins, footballer and coach (died 2018)
 18 September – Tim McInnerny, actor
 29 September – Sebastian Coe, athlete, co-ordinator of London 2012 Olympic Games
 1 October – Theresa May, Prime Minister, Conservative Party leader, MP for Maidenhead 
 20 October – Danny Boyle, film director
 27 October – Hazell Dean, singer
 30 October – Juliet Stevenson, actress
 November – Teresa Borsuk, architect
 5 November – Rob Fisher, keyboardist and songwriter (Climie Fisher) (died 1999)
 8 November – Richard Curtis, screenwriter
 23 November – Jimmy Hibbert, comedian and scriptwriter
 26 November – John McCarthy, journalist and hostage
 28 November – Lucy Gutteridge, film actress
 7 December – Anna Soubry, politician
 19 December – Jimmy Cauty, electronic musician (The KLF), graphic and performance artist
 23 December
 Dave Murray, guitarist (Iron Maiden)
 Simon Wessely, psychiatrist
 28 December – Nigel Kennedy, violinist
 29 December – Fred MacAulay, Scottish comedian

Deaths
 4 January – R. Williams Parry, Welsh poet (born 1884)
 13 January – Wickham Steed, journalist, editor and historian (born 1871)
 14 January – Sheila Kaye-Smith, novelist (born 1887)
 31 January – A. A. Milne, author (born 1882)
 10 February – Hugh Trenchard, 1st Viscount Trenchard, marshal of the Royal Air Force (born 1873)
 25 March – Robert Newton, film actor (born 1905)
 30 March – Edmund Clerihew Bentley, writer (born 1875)
 24 April – Henry Stephenson, character actor (born 1871)
 29 April – Harold Bride, Titanic survivor (born 1890)
 2 May – Violet Gibson, Irish-born attempted assassin (born 1876)
 3 May
 Rodney Collin, writer (born 1909)
 Peter Watson, art collector and benefactor (born 1908)
 17 May – Austin Osman Spare, magician (born 1886)
 18 May – Maurice Tate, cricketer (born 1895)
 20 May – Max Beerbohm, theatre critic (born 1872)
 24 May – Martha Annie Whiteley, chemist and mathematician (born 1866)
 6 June – Margaret Wycherly, actress (born 1881)
 11 June – Frank Brangwyn, artist (born 1867)
 22 June – Walter de la Mare, poet and fiction writer (born 1873)
 28 June – Claud Schuster, 1st Baron Schuster, civil servant (born 1869)
 11 July – Dorothy Wellesley, Duchess of Wellington, socialite, author, poet and literary editor (born 1889)
 5 August – J. M. Andrews, second Prime Minister of Northern Ireland (born 1871)
 19 August – Bernard Griffin, Cardinal of the Roman Catholic Church; Archbishop of Westminster from 1943 until his death (born 1873)
 6 September – Michael Ventris, co-decipherer of Linear B (car accident) (born 1922)
 7 September – C. B. Fry, cricketer (born 1872)
 22 September – Frederick Soddy, chemist, Nobel Prize laureate (born 1877)
 16 October – Jack Southworth, footballer (born 1866)
 17 October – Anne Crawford, film actress (leukemia) (born 1920)
 22 October – Hannah Mitchell, socialist and suffragette (born 1872)
 19 November – Francis L. Sullivan, actor (born 1903)
 24 November – Sir Lionel Whitby, haematologist, clinical pathologist, pharmacologist and army officer (born 1895)
 6 December – Helen Duncan, Scottish medium (born 1897)
 9 December – Charles Joughin, Titanic survivor (born 1878)
 13 December 
 Sir Arthur Grimble, colonial civil servant and travel writer (born 1888)
 Anthony Moorhouse, soldier (murdered in Egypt) (born 1935)
 16 December – Nina Hamnett, artist (born 1890)

See also
 1956 in British music
 1956 in British television
 List of British films of 1956

References

 
Years of the 20th century in the United Kingdom